St. James College of Parañaque (S.J.C.P.) was a private, non-sectarian academic institution in Quezon City, Metro Manila which operated from 1987 to 2012. It was established by Jaime T. Torres, a successful businessman involved in brokerage, real estate and agricultural development business, and Myrna Montealegre-Torres, a former educator at the St. Jude Catholic School and Stella Maris College.

History
Opened in 1987 as St. James School of Parañaque, it was the second branch of the St. James College System (established in 1971) which includes other schools in Quezon City, Metro Manila and Calamba, Laguna. The school was located at 8408 Dr. A. Santos Avenue (more popularly known as Sucat Road) in Parañaque. Its chancellor and dean of education is Dr. Norma M. Abracia, and its principal is Nilda Sergio.

In March 2012, the school ordered its closure and was demolished to give way for SM City BF Parañaque. The front portion was converted into an open parking space and is currently occupied by AutomobiliCo Car Shop, while the rear buildings of the campus are still intact. All documents such as Form 137, Transcript of Records, certification, diploma for alumni are processed/transferred at the Quezon City campus.

Founding and patron saint

Being devout Catholics, school founders Jaime and Myrna Torres found themselves adhering to the path that St. James, their patron saint, had taken. St. James the Greater was one of the twelve Apostles of Jesus Christ, and the patron saint of Spain.

In commemoration of his Feast Day every July 25, several activities were held on campus.

Academics
St. James College offered the following academic programs:

Basic Education
Pre-School
Grade School
High School

College of Hospitality Management
Bachelor of Science in Hospitality Management

College of Education
Bachelor in Elementary Education
Bachelor in Secondary Education majors in Math, English

College of Arts
Bachelor of Arts, major in Psychology

Facilities
Air-conditioned classrooms
Audi-gymnasium
Multi-purpose hall
Quadrangle
Computer Laboratory
Science Laboratory
Speech Laboratory
Home Economics Laboratory
Children's Activity Center
Children's Playground
Audio-Visual Room
Prayer Room
Swimming Pool
Open Field
Music Room
Karate Room
Cottages

College hymn
I.
O hail, hail, hail to thee
Our dearest patron saint
St. James, our Alma Mater
Life and love for you.

II.
We sing our lovely joy
Shower us your holy care
Hail to thee, our dearest saint
St. James, our Alma Mater, 
(Repeat I and II)

III.
We sing our song for you
Hail to thee our patron saint,
St. James, our Alma Mater
We sing our song divinely
Hail to thee, hail to thee
Our patron, dear St. James

(Repeat III)

SJCP 20th anniversary celebration
St. James College of Parañaque celebrated their 20th anniversary November 22–30, 2007. Activities included a torch parade, family day, high school and grade school field demonstrations, a float parade, and a variety show. Since it was raining, the float parade and variety show was moved to December 6.

Many booths were opened inside the campus for the celebration.

Education in Parañaque
Elementary schools in Metro Manila
High schools in Metro Manila
Universities and colleges in Metro Manila
Educational institutions established in 1987
Educational institutions disestablished in 2012
1987 establishments in the Philippines